Connor Wrench (born October 4, 2001) is a professional rugby league footballer who plays as a  for the Warrington Wolves in the Super League.

Playing career

Warrington Wolves
Wrench made his Super League debut in round 14 of the 2020 Super League season for Warrington against the Salford Red Devils.

Newcastle Thunder (loan)
On 6 May 2021 it was reported that he had signed for the Newcastle Thunder in the RFL Championship on loan.

References

External links
Warrington profile

2001 births
Living people
England Knights national rugby league team players
English rugby league players
Newcastle Thunder players
Rugby league centres
Warrington Wolves players